Rolemaster (originally Role Master) is a tabletop role-playing game published by Iron Crown Enterprises since 1980.

Editions 
Rolemaster has a total of five editions.

First edition (RM1): 1980–1982 
This edition includes the original versions of Arms Law, Claw Law, Spell Law, Character Law and Campaign Law. These were available initially as individual books, and later as combined volumes and in boxed sets.

Second edition (RM2): 1984–1994 
In 1984, an initial boxed set was issued containing both expanded and revised rules. The box included Spell Law, a combined Arms Law & Claw Law, Character Law, as well as the Vog Mur campaign module for the Loremaster setting.

Shortly after the first box, a new boxed set was released, containing all of the previous contents as well as The Cloudlords of Tanara, a detailed setting and adventure supplement. The supplement introduced ICE's original Loremaster setting, which would later develop into the more sophisticated Shadow World.

Several additional supplementary books were published individually for the second edition, including three Creatures & Treasures books, and a lot of companion books, expanding the core rules.

Rolemaster Standard System: 1994 
In 1994 the game was revamped and re-released as Rolemaster Standard System (RMSS). The biggest changes were to character generation, particularly in the number of skills available and the method for calculating bonuses for skills. Skills were now grouped into Categories of similar skills and one could buy ranks separately in the category and the actual skill. The combat sequence was revised, and some of the details of spellcasting were changed. The method for learning spell lists was completely overhauled and most of the lists were adjusted and rebalanced.

The new rules were published in the Rolemaster Standard Rules book from 1995, but as with other editions of the game, a plethora of supplementary rulebooks and accessories were subsequently published.

Rolemaster Fantasy Role Playing: 1999 
In 1999 the game underwent a slight restructuring when Rolemaster Fantasy Role Playing (RMFRP) was released, but this was mostly a rearranging of material with very few changes to the rules themselves.

The older single-volume Spell Law was divided into three separate books, Of Essence, Of Channelling and Of Mentalism, each of which expands that realm of power with additional professions and spell lists.

Rolemaster Unified: 2022 

Rolemaster Unified is a new edition based on a number of revisions from RMSS/RMFRP editions.

It consists of Rolemaster: Core Law (containing Character Law, Arms Law, and Gamesmaster Law), Spell Law, Treasure Law and Creature Law (in 2 volumes).  At this time only Core Law is available.

Variant systems 
Iron Crown Enterprises (ICE) went defunct in 2000, and in 2001, they sold the intellectual rights to Rolemaster to the London-based company Aurigas Aldebaron, while the ICE brand name was licensed to a U.S.-based company named Mjolnir LLC. In 2016, the licensing went to Guild Companion Publications, with whom Aurigas Aldebaron merged. From 2017, the merger changed its name to Iron Crown Enterprises, effectively returning to its original, well-known publisher name.

Throughout the various ownership and publisher name changes, Rolemaster remained popular, and the original books eventually sold out and went out of print. This led to several reprints by the new owners and publishers, resulting in three variants of the original Rolemaster game system.

In 1995, the boxed set Rolemaster: The Basics was issued as a simplified version of the Rolemaster Standard System. The box contains rulebooks with all rules necessary for playing this simplified variant of the game.

In 2007, the second edition (RM2) rules system was revitalized and issued under the name Rolemaster Classic, or RMC for short. The revitalization was published by Guild Companion Publications and included new versions of all the old core rulebooks of Arms Law, Spell Law, Character Law, and Creatures and Treasures, but also an updated Rolemaster Companion and a new Combat Companion from 2008.

Also in 2007, Rolemaster Express, or RMX for short, was issued by Guild Companion Publications. It is a simplified version of the Rolemaster Classic System, with all necessary rules combined into a single book.

Basic game mechanics

Rolemaster uses a percentile dice system and employs both classes (called "Professions" in Rolemaster) and levels to describe character capabilities and advancement.

Task resolution is done by rolling percentile dice, applying relevant modifiers, and looking the result up on the appropriate chart to determine the result. There are various charts to increase the realism of the results, but most of these are optional, and many rolls can be made on a relatively small number of tables.

Combat
For combat each character has an Offensive Bonus (OB), which takes into account one's natural physical adeptness, weapon skill, and other factors, and a Defensive Bonus (DB), which takes into account natural agility, the use of shields and "Adrenal Defense", the ability of martial artists to avoid blows seemingly without effort. In addition various modifiers for position, wounds, and other factors are present.

An attacking combatant rolls percentile dice, adds their OB to the total, adds modifiers, and subtracts the defender's DB. The total is then applied to a table for the attacker's weapon. The attack total is cross-indexed with the type of armor (if any) worn by the defender and the result will be a number of concussion hits dealt, which are then subtracted from the defender's running total. If sufficient hits are dealt, the defender may go unconscious, but death seldom results purely from concussion hit damage.

In addition to concussion hits, however, a critical hit can be dealt by the result on the weapon table. These are described by type (slash, crush, puncture, etc.) and by severity (generally A through E, with E being the most severe). Critical Hits (or simply "crits"), can inflict additional concussion hits, bleeding (subtracted from concussion hits at the start of each new round), broken bones, loss of limbs or extremities, internal organ damage and outright death. If a crit is inflicted, a second roll is made on the appropriate critical table.

Thus, unlike, for example, Dungeons & Dragons, Rolemaster describes wounds not only in the number of points of damage dealt (which are then subtracted from an abstract pool of 'Hit Points'), but with specific details of the injury inflicted. Death occurs, for both player characters and Gamemaster-controlled adversaries, primarily through this critical damage, and not through loss of hit points. In addition, specific injuries carry with them injury penalties, which inhibit further actions on the part of the wounded part, and loss of concussion hits (which represent overall health), can bring about similar penalties.

Almost all die rolls in Rolemaster are 'open-ended', meaning that if a result is high enough (or low enough), one rolls again and add (or subtract) the new roll to the original result - and this can happen multiple times, so in theory, there is no upper limit to how well (or poorly) one can roll.  This means that a halfling does have a chance, albeit slight, to put down a troll with one well-placed (and lucky) dagger strike.

However, the fact that one's opponents also fight using these same rules can make Rolemaster a very deadly game for both PCs and NPCs; a lucky shot may let an inexperienced fighter slay a war-hardened veteran.

Fans of the system maintain that this adds a great deal of realism not present in many other fantasy games, and reflects the true deadliness of a well-placed strike from a weapon, even a small one such as a dagger. Death from natural weapons (such as a fist or an animal's teeth and claws) can happen but is very rare against armored combatants. Unarmored characters may very well suffer serious wounds when mauled by animals, but again this allows for more credible confrontations than in other fantasy games, where the threat posed by an "unfantastic" beast such as a wolf, grizzly bear, or tiger is considered minimal.

Because Rolemasters approach to combat favors a warrior that is properly armed and armored, a character that is poorly equipped (as is typically the case with newly generated characters) is decidedly vulnerable. Such characters can have a tough time prevailing against even fairly mundane opponents. This can prove frustrating for new players, and has given rise to hyperbolic tales of housecats cutting down promising young heroes in their prime.

Rolemaster is sometimes derisively called 'Chartmaster' or 'Rulemonster' for depending upon numerous tables and charts for character generation and resolving game actions, and for its perceived vast array of rules covering every possible situation. Supporters of the game argue that many of these rules and charts are entirely optional.

Character creation and development
Rolemaster is a skill-based system in which very few absolute restrictions on skill selection are employed. All character abilities (fighting, stealth, spell use, etc.) are ultimately handled through the skill system. A character's profession represents not a rigid set of abilities available to the character, but rather a set of natural proficiencies in numerous areas. These proficiencies are reflected in the cost to purchase the skills themselves.

Rolemaster characters have ten attributes, called "stats", which represent their natural abilities in such areas as physical strength, memory, self-discipline, agility. Both random and points-based methods for determining stat totals exist, but the final result will be a number on a percentile scale (1-100), which is then used to determine the character's skill bonus at actions which employ that stat. A self-governing system is in place also such that each skill closer to 100 is more costly than the last. Moving a skill from 50 to 51 is almost trivial; from 98 to 99 nigh impossible.

In character creation, and as characters advance in levels, Development Points are assigned, and can be used to purchase skills. In RMSS and RFRP, they can also be spent on Training Packages, which represent a specific bundle of skills, equipment and contacts gained through training. These are optional, and can be ignored if the player prefers to design their character entirely from the ground up.

Skills are purchased in Ranks; the more ranks a character has in a skill, the more able they are at actions covered by that skill. The number of ranks is multiplied by a set number dependent on the total number of ranks the character has, then added to the bonus for the relevant stats. The final number is the character's skill bonus, which is the number actually added to the dice when actions are attempted.

Publications
Below is a list of the many publications connected with the four editions of the Rolemaster game. The lists of setting material and accessories are incomplete. Several of the core rulebooks of each edition of the game were reprinted with new covers but similar content.Rolemaster first editionArms Law (1980)
Character Law (1982)
Claw Law (1982)
Spell Law (1982)
Arms Law / Claw Law - boxed set (1982)

  LoremasterThe Iron Wind (1980)Rolemaster second editionArms Law & Claw Law (1984, 1989)
Spell Law (1984, 1989)
Campaign Law (1984)
Character Law & Campaign Law (1985, 1989)
Creatures & Treasures (1985)
Rolemaster Companion (1986)
Rolemaster Combat Screen (1986)
Rolemaster Companion II (1987)
Rolemaster Companion III (1988)
Elemental Companion (1989)
Creatures & Treasures II (1989)
Rolemaster Companion IV (1990)
Rolemaster Character Records (1990)
Rolemaster Heroes & Rogues (1991)
Rolemaster Companion V (1991)
Spell User's Companion (1991)
War Law - boxed set (1992)
Alchemy Companion (1992)
Rolemaster Companion VI (1992)
Arms Companion (1993)
Rolemaster Companion VII (1993)
Creatures & Treasures III (1993)
Sea Law (1994)

  Shadow WorldThe Cloudlords of Tanara (1984)
The Shade of the Sinking Plain (1984)
The World of Vog Mur (1984)
Cyclops Vale (1989)
Demons of the Burning Night (1989)
Islands of the Oracle (1989)
Jaiman, Land of Twilight (1989)
Journey to the Magic Isle (1989)
Kingdom of the Desert Jewel (1989)
The Ogrillion Horror (1989)
Quellbourne, Land of the Silver Mist (1989)
Shadow World Master Atlas (1989)
Star Crown Empire and the Sea of Fates (1989)
Tales of the Loremasters (1989)
Tales of the Loremasters II (1989)
Emer and Master Atlas Addendum (1990)
Nomads of the Nine Nations (1990)
Norek: Intrigue in a City-State of Jaiman (1990)
Sky Giants of the Brass Stair (1990)

  Genre SupplementsRobin Hood: A Giant Outlaw Campaign (1987)
Mythic Greece: The Age of Heroes (1988)
Vikings (1989)
Pirates (1990)
Mythic Egypt (1990)
Dark Space (1990)
Outlaw (1991)
Timeriders (1992)
Oriental Companion (1992)
At Rapier's Point (1993)
Arabian Nights (1994)Rolemaster Standard SystemArms Law (1994)
Spell Law (1995)
Creatures & Monsters (1995)
Gamemaster Law (1995)
Rolemaster Standard Rules (1995)
Player Guide (1995)
Arcane Companion (1996)
Treasure Companion (1996)
Races & Cultures: Underground Races (1996)
Castles & Ruins (1996)
Talent Law (1996)
Weapon Law - Firearms (1996)
Martial Arts Companion (1997)
Essence Companion (1997)
Channeling Companion (1998)
Mentalism Companion (1998)
...and a 10-Foot Pole (1999)
10 Million Ways To Die (1999)

  Shadow WorldCurse of Kabis (1995)

  GenericBlack Ops (1997)
Shades of Darkness (1997)
Pulp Adventures (1997)
Nightmares of Mine (1999)Rolemaster Fantasy Role PlayingArms Law (1999)
Character Law (1999)
Spell Law: Of Essence (1999)
Spell Law: Of Channeling (1999)
Spell Law: Of Mentalism (1999)
Gamemaster Law (1999)
Creatures & Monsters (1999)
Rolemaster Fantasy Role Playing (1999)
Treasure Companion (2000)
School of Hard Knocks - The Skill Companion (2000)
Channeling Companion (2000)
Fire & Ice: The Elemental Companion (2002)
The Armory (2002)
Mentalism Companion (2003)
Construct Companion (2003)
Races and Cultures (2004)

  Shadow WorldShadow World Master Atlas (2001)

  AernthCity of Archendurn (2002)
Dún Crú (2009)

  The Echoes of HeavenThe Echoes of Heaven Campaign Setting (2006)
The Last Free City (2006)
On Corrupted Ground (2007)
Bestiary (2007)
In His Name (2014)
The Day Before Apocalypse (2014)

 Supplementary publications 
Several publications and magazines with supplementary game material has been issued under the ICE brand over the years.

For the Rolemaster Standard System, Rolemaster Annual 1996 and Rolemaster Annual 1997 included new additional rules for that game system, including new professions, races, spelllists, and errata.

For the Rolemaster Fantasy Role Playing system, Guild Companion Publications (GCP) issued Rolemaster Quarterly from April 2006 to August 2007. The magazine was dedicated to presenting optional rules and play material, and a total of seven magazines were published.

Several Electronic Roleplaying Assistants (ERAs) have been issued for use with the RMC, RMSS and RMFRP systems since 2005. They are computer applications, developed for use with Windows, Mac OSX and Linux, helping players and game masters running the game digitally, including character creation and management.

Reception
In the August 1984 edition of Dragon (Issue #88), Arlen Walker asked if the hefty $48 price tag for the second edition boxed set was worth the money, and provided a long and in-depth examination of the box's contents. Walker had quibbles over the combat system, which seemed to generalize rather than individualize weapons; and he felt the book on animal encounters had very little information about the actual animals. Walker concluded, "Is the Rolemaster system worth the $48, then? The answer is a resounding 'maybe.' If you want a freer, more open game than you are currently playing, I’d say it is probably worth it. Even with the inconsistencies noted it still allows more freedom of choice than almost any other game. Although the physical size of the game is rather imposing, the actual mechanics run rather smoothly and simply."

Walker also reviewed the separately published books Character Law, Campaign Law, Spell Law, Claw Law and Arms Law. 
 Character Law Although Walker liked the ability to move randomly generated ability scores around to produce the most beneficial results for the character class sought, he disagreed with the system of rolling dice ten times in order to generate character abilities, and then raising two of those abilities up to 90, if they were not already 90 or better. Walker felt this created a monochrome cast of characters and non-player characters. Walker liked the different ways that characters could gain experience points, such as travel, having religious experiences such as visions, and for coming up with a brilliant idea — although he thought this one would probably lead to arguments over which player had originally voiced the germ of the idea. But he didn't like the idea that characters get experience points for dying.
 Spell Law Walker was impressed with the variety of spells detailed in Spell Law, numbering over two thousand. He found that the "spell-casting system is somewhat more complicated than in other games, but not unplayably so."
 Arms Law He had quibbles about Arms Law — combat was very fast and lethal due to the high amount of damage inflicted by a single blow, and he believed that new players used to other role-playing systems should be made aware of this. Walker also questioned why a character could not parry with a two-handed weapon, although he realized it was probably "a concession to speed of play."
 Claw Law Walker criticized the lack of descriptions of the animals covered in Claw Law, saying, "The animal descriptions have little if anything to do with animals. Calling them descriptions, in fact, is probably overstating the case dramatically... We are told nothing else about the animal, including what it looks like, where it can be found, and how it will behave if found." Walker went on to question why "Historical Weapons" were found in this book, which was supposed to be about damage from animals and monsters, rather than in Arms Law. He also criticized the lack of variety these weapons represented, since to calculate damage and other combat-related numbers for these exotic weapons, referees were simply referred to equivalent weapons in Arms Law. "For example, if you wish to have your character use a Katana, you use the same chart as if he were using a broadsword. The cover blurbs (for Arms Law) say, 'Because a mace is not an arrow or a scimitar...' yet this section says a broadsword is both a long sword and a sabre (as well as a Katana) and a dart is a dagger, because they use the same tables."
 Campaign Law''' Unlike the first four books, Walker had high praise for Campaign Law, saying, "Whether you’re looking for a new system to run or not, Campaign Law is definitely worth the $10 price of admission. The information and guidelines this book will give you on fleshing out and filling in a consistent campaign world are almost invaluable. All I can say is that if this book had been available when I first began running campaigns, it would have saved me at least a year of development time."

Eleven years later in the September 1995 edition of Dragon (Issue 221), Rick Swan reviewed the updated 144-page Arms Law book that had been released in conjunction with the revised Rolemaster Standard System edition. Swan still found the complexity of the Rolemaster system astounding, saying, "With its tidal wave of numbers, formulas, and tables, the Rolemaster game always struck me as the kind of fantasy RPG that calculus professors play on their day off." Swan found Arms Law to be "mainly a book of tables — more than 100 pages worth." He gave the book an average rating of 4 out of 6, and recommended it only for the mathematically inclined: "If you read computer manuals for fun, if you get misty-eyed thinking about your high school algebra class, if you wonder why your friends complain about something as trivial as filling out tax forms, then Rolemaster ought to be right up your alley. Arms Law is as good a place as any to begin your investigation."

A year later, in the July 1996 edition of Dragon (Issue 231), Swan reviewed the new supplement Arcane Companion that had been published in conjunction with the revision of the magic system in  the Rolemaster Standard System edition. Swan reiterated that the Rolemaster system was a mathematician's delight: "Saturated with charts and numbers, it's for players who buy pocket calculators by the crate... If you're the kind of guy who needs his fingers to do arithmetic, this ain't your kind of game." Despite this, Swan found Arcane Companion to be "not only comprehensible, but entertaining, thanks to the designers’ efforts to infuse the facts and figures with vivid imagery." Swan concluded that because this supplement was so solidly linked to the Rolemaster system, it could not be ported to another game system, but "experienced players should welcome this ambitious expansion with open arms. And if you’re among those who’ve dismissed Rolemaster as not worth the effort, sneak a peek at Arcane Companion; it might tempt you to reconsider."

In a 1996 reader poll conducted by Arcane magazine to determine the 50 best roleplaying systems, Rolemaster was ranked 15th. Arcane editor Paul Pettengale commented: "Often used as an archetypal example of a complex roleplaying system, Rolemaster is a fairly numbers-heavy game that also relies on the use of a lot of tables. Most notable are its notorious 'critical hit' charts, which are subdivided by damage type and describe various horrific wounds in graphic detail. If you're looking for a highly detailed and fairly complex system, Rolemaster has a great deal to recommend it. The rules are fairly well organised and very flexible, easily adaptable to a wide variety of situations. On the other hand, if you're not one for tables and calculations, it's probably not going to ring your bell."

ReviewsDifferent Worlds #37 (Nov./Dec., 1984)Fantasy Gamer #1 (Aug./Sept., 1983)Dosdediez (Número 2 - Ene/Feb 1994)Jeux & Stratégie'' nouvelle formule #5

See also
Shadow World (role playing game)
High Adventure Role Playing (HARP)
Spacemaster
Middle-earth Role Playing
Lord of the Rings Adventure Game

References

External links
Iron Crown Enterprises

 
Fantasy role-playing games
Iron Crown Enterprises games